Sharipovka (Şärip) is a rural locality (a village) in Izyaksky Selsoviet, Blagoveshchensky District, Bashkortostan, Russia. The population was 93 as of 2010. There are 3 streets.

Geography 
Sharipovka is located 31 km southeast of Blagoveshchensk (the district's administrative centre) by road. Gorny Urazbay is the nearest rural locality.

References 

Rural localities in Blagoveshchensky District